Vernalis may refer to:
 Vernalis Research, a British pharmaceutical research company
 Vernalis plc, a former British pharmaceutical company (2003-2018)
 Vernalis Group, a former British pharmaceutical company (1991-2003)
 Vernalis, California, an unincorporated US community

See also
 Includes many plant and animal names